The International Association for Engineering and Food (IAEF) is a global body of around 25 delegates representing professional engineering societies including food engineering activities. This organization is mainly in charge of identifying the sites for ICEF events. ICEF, International Congress on Engineering and Food, is the most important congress in the field of food engineering. It is usually held in a four year cycle at different locations. The other main assignment of IAEF is to elect its President who is the organiser of the next ICEF event.

ICEF Events
 ICEF 14: Nantes, 2023
 ICEF 13: Melbourne, 2019
 ICEF 12: Québec City, 2015
 ICEF 11: Athens, 2011
 ICEF 10: Viña del Mar, 2008
 ICEF 9: Montpellier, 2004
 ICEF 8: Puebla, 2000 
 ICEF 7: Brighton, 1997 
 ICEF 6: Chiba, 1993 
 ICEF 5: Cologne, 1989  
 ICEF 4: Edmonton, 1985 
 ICEF 3: Dublin, 1983
 ICEF 2: Helsinki, 1979 
 ICEF 1: Boston, 1976

See also

 Food Engineering
 Food Science
 Food Technology

External links 
 ICEF 13 Website
 ICEF 11 Website
 Contemporary Food Engineering (CRC Press)
 Contemporary Food Engineering (Taylor & Francis) 
 Contemporary Food Engineering (Routledge)
Food Engineering Magazine
Food Engineering News from the IMechE
Institute of Food Technologists Food Engineering Division website

Engineering societies
International learned societies
International professional associations
Societies
Food technology organizations
Food industry trade groups